Spilarctia hypogopa is a moth in the family Erebidae. It was described by George Hampson in 1907. It is found on Peninsular Malaysia, Sumatra and Borneo. The habitat consists of lowland forests and secondary vegetation.

References

Moths described in 1907
hypogopa